The Brown Bears represent Brown University in ECAC women's ice hockey during the 2017–18 NCAA Division I women's ice hockey season.

Recruiting

Roster

Standings

Schedule

|-
!colspan=12 style="background:#381C00; color:white;"| Regular Season

Awards and honors
 Sam Donovan, 2017-18 Honorable Mention All-Ivy

References

Brown
2017 in sports in Rhode Island
2018 in sports in Rhode Island
Brown Bears women's ice hockey seasons